The Liquor Licensing Board (LLB) is the licensing body for the sale of alcohol in Hong Kong. LLB is responsible for licensing and not retail sales. In line with Hong Kong law, alcohol can be sold freely in licensed retail stores in Hong Kong.

History
The LLB was created to replace the licensing boards formerly organised under the Urban Council and Regional Council, which were disbanded at the end of 1999.

Management 

The LLB is governed by a board that consists of a chair, vice-chair and nine appointed board members. The agency is under the jurisdiction of the Food and Environmental Hygiene Department. Members of the board are appointed by the Chief Executive of Hong Kong.

Enforcement 

Laws enforced by the LLB include:

 Dutiable Commodities Ordinance, Cap 109
 Cap 109 B Regulations 17
 Dutible Commodities (Liquor) Regulations

See also
 Alcohol laws in Hong Kong

References

External links
 

Government of Hong Kong
Alcohol law in Hong Kong
Alcohol agencies